The Cross Examination Debate Association (CEDA) is the largest intercollegiate policy debate association in the United States. Throughout the school year, CEDA sanctions over 60 tournaments throughout the nation, including an annual National Championship Tournament that brings together over 175 individual debate teams from across the nation to compete on the basis of research, persuasive speaking, argumentation, and philosophy.

For a number of years, CEDA employed a two-person team value debate format. CEDA utilized two topics each year, one governing the fall semester and the second governing the spring semester. For the spring 1996 topic, it was voted to continue debating the fall topic about Mexico.  Beginning with the 1996–1997 season, however, CEDA has employed a single, year-long policy debate topic.

Controversy
In the 2013 tournament, the winning team from Emporia State University was criticized for using personal memoirs and rap music to criticize white privilege during the debate, while failing to address the stated resolution. CEDA President Paul Mabrey points to the value of limited actual formal rules in CEDA debate and the ways that a variety of forms of debate raise the educational value of the activity and call these objections "nothing other than thinly-veiled racism." Other teams participating in the debates have said "the pedagogical goals of policy debate are not being met-and are even being undermined."

In 2014, despite winning the tournament, the team from Towson University was criticized by observers for referencing racial slurs, failing to adhere to standard debate practices and arguing a topic unrelated to the proposed resolution. These types of debate strategies "[have] received mainstream acceptance, sympathy, and awards", despite objections and complaints from tournament participants, labelling the strategies as offensive. In the wake of this controversy, CEDA President Paul Mabrey stated in an official CEDA video of that the accusations of poor preparation and incomprehensibility "...[R]epresent the worst of our human bigotry. These attacks on Towson, Oklahoma, and others in our debate community are motivated by racism and fear."

National Tournament results
2013 - Champion: Emporia State University (Ryan Walsh and Elijah Smith) 
2014 - Champion: Towson University (Ameena Ruffin and Korey Johnson) Runner-up: University of Oklahoma (Rashid Campbell and George Lee) 
2019 - Champion: University of Oklahoma (Jazmine Pickens and Darius White) Runner-up: University of Kansas (Azja Butler and Kenny Delph)
2020 - Cancelled due to the COVID-19 pandemic

See also 

 Competitive debate in the United States

References

External links
CEDA Debate Website
CEDA/NDT Community Forum

Student debating societies
Policy debate
North American debating competitions
Organizations established in 1971
1971 establishments in the United States